Hilde Heynen (born May 26, 1959 in Deurne) is professor of architectural theory at the Katholieke Universiteit Leuven. She researches modernism, modernity, and gender in architecture. Heynen is the author of several books and publishes regularly in architectural journals such as the Harvard Design Magazine, The Journal of Architecture, and The Architectural Review   of which she is a member of the editorial board. She is also a board member of the European Association of Architectural Education (EAAE) and the Society of Architectural Historians (SAH).

Heynen is a member of the Royal Flemish Academy of Belgium for Science and the Arts since 2009.

Academic career
She has graduated from Katholieke Universiteit Leuven where she has studied both philosophy and architecture. She has also spent some time in  J. Paul Getty Foundation as a Postdoctoral Fellow. Beside being a professor of architecture theory at the Katholieke Universiteit Leuven, Heynen works with 
Massachusetts Institute of Technology, the Architectural Association School of Architecture in London, and RMIT University in Melbourne as visiting professor.

Books
 Architecture and Modernity: A Critique. MIT Press, 1999
 Dat is architectuur. Sleutelteksten uit de 20ste eeuw (co-editor). 010 Publishers, 2001
 Back from Utopia. The Challenge of the Modern Movement. 010 Publishers, 2002
 Inside Density. La Lettre Volée, 2003
 Negotiating Domesticity. Routledge, 2005
 The SAGE Handbook of Architectural Theory, SAGE Publications, 2011.
 Sibyl Moholy-Nagy: Architecture, Modernism and its Discontents, Bloomsbury Academic, 2019.

Grants 
 The Research Foundation Flanders
 The Research Council of the Katholieke Universiteit Leuven
 The Netherlands Architecture Fund
 Graham Foundation for Advanced Studies in the Fine Arts.

References

External links
Profile and CV at KU Leuven
Texts by Hilde Heynen at the Digitale Bibliotheek voor de Nederlandse Letteren

Belgian educators
Living people
Architectural theoreticians
1959 births
Architectural historians